Krešimir Bandić (16 September 1995 – 5 March 2019) was a Bosnian professional footballer who played as a goalkeeper.

Death 
On 5 March 2019, Bandić died of a heart attack aged 23.

References

1995 births
2019 deaths
Sportspeople from Mostar
Bosnia and Herzegovina footballers
Association football goalkeepers
HŠK Zrinjski Mostar players
HNK Branitelj players
NK Široki Brijeg players
Premier League of Bosnia and Herzegovina players